Footy Legends is a 2006 Australian film, directed and co-written by Khoa Do, produced by Megan McMurchy, starring Khoa's older brother and co-writer Anh Do, Angus Sampson, Emma Lung and Claudia Karvan. It was filmed in and around the Sydney western suburbs of Yagoona, Bankstown, Fairfield and Rookwood Necropolis. Footy Legends was released in Australia on 3 August 2006.

Plot
Set in Sydney's western suburbs Yagoona and Bankstown, Footy Legends tells the story of Luc Vu (Anh Do), a young Vietnamese Australian man with an obsession about rugby league football. Out of work and with welfare authorities threatening to take away his little sister (Lisa Saggers), because their parents are dead and Luc is deemed incapable of being a responsible guardian, Luc re-unites his old Yagoona High School "footy" team—whose members are now facing social problems such as long-term unemployment, drug addictions, the after-effects of teenage parenting—and wins a competition that offers a Holden Ute and a modelling job for Lowes Menswear as its prize. It is mostly comedy which is underpinned with serious social issues affecting western Sydney.

The film features Vietnamese-language dialogue between Vu, Anne, and their aged grandfather.

Cast

The film also features cameos from such ex-footballers Rod Wishart, Brett Kenny, Brad Clyde and Cliff Lyons, who play for Double Bay, the team that Vu's Yagoona defeat in the final in the film. The film also features a team called the Dubbo Dingoes which features Damion Hunter, a star indigenous actor.

Box office
Footy Legends grossed $557,331 at the box office in Australia.

See also
Better Man
Schapelle

References

External links

Footy Legends at the National Film and Sound Archive

2006 films
2000s sports comedy-drama films
2006 independent films
Vietnamese-language films
Australian sports comedy-drama films
Australian independent films
Rugby league films
Films scored by Dale Cornelius
2000s English-language films
2000s Australian films